Alberto Falcón (born 3 May 1970) is a Spanish fencer. He competed in the sabre events at the 1992 and 2000 Summer Olympics.

References

External links
 

1970 births
Living people
Spanish male sabre fencers
Olympic fencers of Spain
Fencers at the 1992 Summer Olympics
Fencers at the 2000 Summer Olympics
Fencers from Madrid